Remix was the first remix album released by Mushroomhead in July 1997. All tracks are remixes except for "Everyone's Got One" (hence the subtitle "Only Mix"). The last portion of "Episode 29 (Hardcore Mix)" was used on the XX album as "Episode 29". The original release of Multimedia Remix also included live recordings of Mushroomhead performing "Born of Desire" and "Chancre Sore" at Nautica in Cleveland (now known as The Scene Pavilion) as well as a video for "Simpleton".

Track listing
 "Bwomp" (Full Length Mix) 
 "Elevation" (Skin Mix) 
 "2nd Thoughts" (Fuck Like Pigs Mix) 
 "Episode 29" (Hardcore Mix) 
 "Snap" (Gravy Mix) 
 "Mommy" (Malfunction Mix) 
 "Everyone's Got One" (Only Mix)
 "The Wrist" (Hand of Solo Mix)

Mushroomhead albums
1997 remix albums